Leslie Zim Wallace (22 May 1894 – 26 December 1970) was an Australian rules footballer who played with Melbourne in the Victorian Football League (VFL).

Notes

External links 

1894 births
1970 deaths
Australian rules footballers from Victoria (Australia)
Melbourne Football Club players
People from Traralgon
Australian military personnel of World War I